Buffalo Electric Carriage Company was a Brass Era manufacturer of electric automobiles in Buffalo, New York.

The 1904 Buffalo Stanhope was a stanhope model. It could seat 2 passengers and sold for US$1650.  The single electric motor produced 2.5 hp (1.9 kW).  The car weighed 1800 lb (816 kg).

The 1904 Buffalo Golf Brake was a surrey model.  Equipped with a tonneau, it could seat 6 passengers and sold for US$2200.  Two electric motors were situated at the rear of the car, produced 2.5 hp (1.9 kW) each.  The car weighed 2200 lb (998 kg).

The 1904 Buffalo Tonneau was a tonneau model.  It could seat 4 passengers and sold for US$3000.  The dual electric motors, situated at the rear of the car, produced 5 hp (3.7 kW) each and used a 40-cell pasted plate battery.  The car weighed 3600 lb (1633 kg).

See also
Buffalo Electric Vehicle Company

References
 Frank Leslie's Popular Monthly (January, 1904)

Electric vehicles introduced in the 20th century
Motor vehicle manufacturers based in New York (state)
Defunct motor vehicle manufacturers of the United States
Brass Era vehicles
History of Buffalo, New York
Vehicle manufacturing companies established in 1904
1904 establishments in New York (state)
Manufacturing companies based in Buffalo, New York